Lake Hitchcock was a glacial lake that formed approximately 15,000 years ago in the late Pleistocene epoch.  After the Laurentide Ice Sheet retreated, glacial ice melt accumulated at the terminal moraine and blocked up the Connecticut River, creating the long, narrow lake. The lake existed for approximately 3,000 years, after which a combination of erosion and continuing geological changes likely caused it to drain. At its longest, Lake Hitchcock stretched from the moraine dam at present-day Rocky Hill, Connecticut, to St. Johnsbury, Vermont (about ). Although the rift valley through which the river flows above Rocky Hill actually continues south to New Haven, on Long Island Sound, the obstructing moraine at Rocky Hill diverted the river southeast to its present mouth at Old Saybrook.

Lake Hitchcock is an important part of the geology of Connecticut. It experienced annual layering of sediments, or varves: silt and sand in the summertime (due to glacial meltwater) and clay in the wintertime (as the lake froze). Analysis of varves along Canoe Brook in Vermont was conducted by John Ridge and Frederick Larsen, including radiocarbon dating of organic materials. Their research indicates that the lake formed sometime prior to around 15,600 years ago. Later, abrupt changes in sediment composition around 12,400 years ago appear to mark the initial breaching of the lake's dam. These varved lake deposits were later used by European settlers for brick-making. The lake was named after Edward Hitchcock (1793–1864), a geology professor from Amherst College who had studied it.

See also
 Champlain Sea
 Lake Albany
 Lake Connecticut
 Lake Merrimack
 Lake Stowe

References

Connecticut River
Former lakes of the United States
Glacial lakes of the United States
Proglacial lakes